Ossa may refer to:

Places
Ossa, Opoczno County in Łódź Voivodeship (central Poland)
Ossa, Rawa County in Łódź Voivodeship (central Poland)
Ossa, Masovian Voivodeship (east-central Poland)
Ossa, Larissa, village in Larissa regional unit, Greece
Ossa, Thessaloniki, village in Thessaloniki regional unit, Greece
Lake Ossa, Littoral Province, Cameroon
Mount Ossa (Greece), also known as Kissavos
Ossa cave
Mount Ossa (Tasmania), Tasmania, Australia
Mount Ossa National Park, Queensland, Australia
Osobłoga,, a river in the Czech Republic and Poland

Other uses
Battle of Ossa, an 1863 battle near Ossa, Masovian Voivodeship
Ossa (motorcycle), a Spanish motorcycle company
Ossa (mythology)

See also
Osa (disambiguation)
OSSA (disambiguation)
Osse (disambiguation)